The Sixteenth Dynasty of ancient Egypt (notated Dynasty XVI) was a dynasty of pharaohs that ruled the Theban region in Upper Egypt for 70 years.

This dynasty, together with the 15th and 17th dynasties, are often combined under the group title, Second Intermediate Period (c. 1650–1550 BC), a period that saw the division of Upper and Lower Egypt between the pharaohs at Thebes and the Hyksos kings of the 15th Dynasty based at Avaris.

Identification
Of the two chief versions of Manetho's Aegyptiaca, the Sixteenth Dynasty is described by the more reliable Africanus (supported by Syncellus) as "shepherd [hyksos] kings", but by Eusebius as Theban.

Ryholt (1997), followed by Bourriau (2003), in reconstructing the Turin canon, interpreted a list of Thebes-based kings to constitute Manetho's Sixteenth Dynasty, although this is one of Ryholt's "most debatable and far-reaching" conclusions. For this reason other scholars do not follow Ryholt and see only insufficient evidence for the interpretation of the Sixteenth Dynasty as Theban.

History
The continuing war against 15th Dynasty dominated the short-lived 16th Dynasty. The armies of the 15th Dynasty, winning town after town from their southern enemies, continually encroached on the 16th Dynasty territory, eventually threatening and then conquering Thebes itself. In his study of the Second Intermediate Period, the Egyptologist Kim Ryholt has suggested that Dedumose I sued for a truce in the latter years of the dynasty, but one of his predecessors, Nebiryraw I, may have been more successful and seems to have enjoyed a period of peace in his reign.

Famine, which had plagued Upper Egypt during the late 13th Dynasty and the 14th Dynasty, also blighted the 16th Dynasty, most evidently during and after the reign of Neferhotep III.

Kings
Various chronological orderings and lists of kings have been proposed by scholars for this dynasty. These lists fall broadly in two categories: those assuming that the 16th Dynasty comprised vassals of the Hyksos, as advocated by Jürgen von Beckerath and Wolfgang Helck; and those assuming that the 16th Dynasty was an independent Theban kingdom, as recently proposed by Kim Ryholt.

Vassals of the Hyksos
The traditional list of rulers of the 16th Dynasty regroups kings believed to be vassals of the Hyksos, some of which have semitic names such as Semqen and Anat-her. The list of kings differs from scholar to scholar and it is here given as per Jürgen von Beckerath's Dynasty XV/XVI in his Handbuch der ägyptischen Königsnamen. Wolfgang Helck, who also believes that the 16th Dynasty was an Hyksos vassal state, proposed a slightly different list of kings. Many of the rulers listed here in the 16th Dynasty under the hypothesis that they were vassals of the Hyksos are put in the 14th Dynasty in the hypothesis that the 16th Dynasty was an independent Theban kingdom. The chronological ordering is largely uncertain.

Independent Theban Kingdom
In his 1997 study of the Second Intermediate Period, the Danish Egyptologist Kim Ryholt argues that the 16th Dynasty was an independent Theban kingdom. From Ryholt's reconstruction of the Turin canon, 15 kings can be associated to the dynasty, several of whom are attested by contemporary sources. While most likely rulers based in Thebes itself, some may have been local rulers from other important Upper Egyptian towns, including Abydos, El Kab and Edfu. By the reign of Nebiriau I, the realm controlled by the 16th Dynasty extended at least as far north as Hu and south to Edfu. Not listed in the Turin canon (after Ryholt) is Wepwawetemsaf, who left a stele at Abydos and was likely a local kinglet of the Abydos Dynasty.

Ryholt gives the list of kings of the 16th Dynasty as shown in the table below. Others, such as Helck, Vandersleyen, Bennett combine some of these rulers with the Seventeenth Dynasty of Egypt. The list of rulers is given here as per Kim Ryholt and is supposedly in chronological order:

Additional kings are classified as belonging to this dynasty per Kim Ryholt but their chronological position is uncertain. They may correspond to the last five lost kings on the Turin canon:

References

Bibliography
 
 
 
 

 
States and territories established in the 17th century BC
States and territories disestablished in the 16th century BC
16th century BC in Egypt
17th century BC in Egypt
16
2nd-millennium BC disestablishments in Egypt
2nd-millennium BC establishments in Egypt
16
Hyksos